Dominium maris (lat. for "sea dominion") can refer to several Late Middle Ages policies of seafaring European states:
 Dominium maris baltici ("Baltic Sea dominion")
 Dominium maris septentrionalis ("Northern Seas dominion")